American Tune is an album of rehearsal tapes and live recordings by American singer Eva Cassidy, released in 2003, seven years after her death in 1996. It was her second album of mainly live material and her third posthumous album. American Tune spent five weeks on the U.S. Billboard Top 200, and was a UK number one album.

Reception

Writing for Sing Out! magazine, Jamie Anderson calls every song on the album "a gem...either remaining true to the original song or presenting the piece in a new way without syrupy trappings".

Track listing 
 "Drowning in the Sea of Love" [live] (Kenneth Gamble, Leon Huff) – 4:19
 "True Colors" [live] (Thomas Kelly, Billy Steinberg) – 4:50
 "The Water Is Wide" [live] (Traditional) – 4:20
 "Hallelujah I Love Him So" (Ray Charles) – 2:33
 "God Bless the Child" [live] (Arthur Herzog Jr., Billie Holiday) – 5:17
 "Dark Eyed Molly" [live] (Archie Fisher) – 3:28
 "American Tune" [live] (Paul Simon) – 4:06
 "It Don't Mean a Thing (If It Ain't Got That Swing)" [live] (Duke Ellington, Irving Mills) – 2:23
 "Yesterday" (Lennon–McCartney) – 3:09
 "You Take My Breath Away" [live] (Claire Hamill) – 5:39

Personnel 
 Eva Cassidy – guitar, rhythm guitar, vocals
 Chris Biondo – bass
 Jimmy Campbell – drums
 Dan Cassidy – violin
 Keith Grimes – electric guitar
 Marcy Marxer – bouzouki, guitar, tin whistle
 Raice McLeod – drums
 Bruno Nasta – violin
 Lenny Williams – organ, piano

Production 
 Producer: Chris Biondo
 Engineers: Chris Biondo, Cathy Fink, Bryan McCulley
 Mastering: Robert Vosgien
 Technical assistance: Brian Grant
 Arranger: Eva Cassidy
 Overdubs: Marcy Marxer, Geoff Gillette
 Sequencing: Bill Straw
 Design: Eileen White
 Photography: Chris Biondo
 Drawing: Eva Cassidy
 Liner notes: Martin Jennings
 Compilation: Bill Straw

Charts

Weekly charts

Year-end charts

Certifications

References 

Eva Cassidy albums
2003 live albums
Live albums published posthumously